{{Drugbox
| Verifiedfields = changed
| verifiedrevid = 477318521
| IUPAC_name = N-[(2R)-3,4-dihydro-2H-chromen-2-ylmethyl]-''N-(1,4,5,6-tetrahydropyrimidin-2-yl)propane-1,3-diamine
| image = Alniditan.svg

| tradename =  
| pregnancy_category =  
| legal_status =  
| routes_of_administration =

| bioavailability =  
| metabolism =  
| elimination_half-life =  
| excretion =

| CAS_number_Ref = 
| CAS_number = 152317-89-0
| ATC_prefix = none
| ATC_suffix =  
| PubChem = 66004
| IUPHAR_ligand = 120
| ChemSpiderID_Ref = 
| ChemSpiderID = 59396
| UNII_Ref = 
| UNII = B57Z82EOGE
| KEGG_Ref = 
| KEGG = D02826
| ChEMBL_Ref = 
| ChEMBL = 88240

| index2_label = Dihydrochloride 
| CAS_number2_Ref = 
| CAS_number2 =	155428-00-5

| UNII2_Ref = 
| UNII2 = 54PE58MGKB

| C=17 | H=26 | N=4 | O=1 
| smiles = C1CNC(=NC1)NCCCNCC2CCC3=CC=CC=C3O2
| StdInChI_Ref = 
| StdInChI = 1S/C17H26N4O/c1-2-6-16-14(5-1)7-8-15(22-16)13-18-9-3-10-19-17-20-11-4-12-21-17/h1-2,5-6,15,18H,3-4,7-13H2,(H2,19,20,21)/t15-/m1/s1
| StdInChIKey_Ref = 
| StdInChIKey = QVSXOXCYXPQXMF-OAHLLOKOSA-N
}}Alniditan is a 5-HT1D receptor agonist with migraine-preventive effects.

Synthesis
The sizeable number of serotonergic drugs for treating migraines all incorporate the indole nucleus found in serotonin itself. It is
thus of interest that a compound based on a benzopyran manifests much the same activity.

Alkylation of phenol with 2-bromobutyrolactone (2) leads to the ether (3). Oxidation of that product with chromium trioxide then leads to the substituted succinic anhydride (4). Treatment of anhydride with polyphosphoric acid leads to
the acylation of the aromatic ring and the formation of the benzopyranone ring (5). The ketone is then selectively reduced by any of several methods, as, for example, conversion to a dithiolane followed by Mozingo reduction to 6. The carboxylic acid is next reduced to the corresponding aldehyde (7) by successive conversion to an acid chloride followed by hydrogenation in the presence of thiophene. A second hydrogenation in the presence of benzylamine leads to the reductive amination product (8). Michael addition of the amino group in 8 to acrylonitrile leads to a 1,4-addition and the formation of (9). Reduction of the nitrile affords the diamine (10). Reaction of this last diamine with tetrahydropyrimidine chloride (11), itself formed by treatment of trimethylene urea with phosphorus oxychloride, leads to the displacement of halogen by the terminal, and thus more accessible, amino group in (10). There is thus formed the serotonergic agent alniditan (12''').

References 

Antimigraine drugs
Benzopyrans
5-HT1D agonists